Bodilis is a commune in the Finistère department of Brittany in north-western France.

Population
Inhabitants of Bodilis are called Bodilisiens in French.

Sights

See also
Communes of the Finistère department
Roland Doré sculptor
Bodilis Parish close
List of the works of the Maître de Plougastel

References

External links

Official website
 Mayors of Finistère Association  ;

Communes of Finistère